Craig Brian Raymond Stone (born 29 December 1988) is an English footballer who works for Hastings United as a player-coach and also manager of the Gillingham under 18 and under 23 teams.

As a player, he came through the Gillingham youth ranks, making his league debut as a 16-year-old in the 2005–06 season and played in central midfield or at right-back.

Career
Stone joined Gillingham at the age of 10 and made his first appearance for the club in a 3–1 victory over Hartlepool United on 1 November 2005. He signed his first professional contract in May 2007, a one-year deal with an option of another year.

On 17 January 2008, Stone joined Brentford on a one-month loan, which was later extended for a second month. On his return to Priestfield Stadium he still could not command a regular place in the team and he was released at the end of his contract and joined non-League club Ebbsfleet United in time for the 2008–09 season. On 21 February 2009, he broke his leg in a match against Wrexham and was expected to miss the remainder of the season. A group of Ebbsfleet supporters got together to help Stone pass the time whilst out injured by purchasing a PlayStation 3.

In February 2010, Stone joined Isthmian League club Maidstone United in a bid to regain fitness before returning to the professional game. He joined up with The Stones' caretaker management team of Pete Nott and Tony Cornwell, who coached him as a youngster. In August of the same year, he re-joined Ebbsfleet United.

In June 2015, Stone signed a two-year deal to join Eastbourne Borough of the National League South. He was released at the end of his contract and dropped back down to the Isthmian League Premier Division to join Tonbridge Angels in May 2017. He left Tonbridge at the end of the 2018–19 season, having helped them to achieve promotion to the National League South.

Coaching
On leaving Tonbridge, he was scheduled to take up a player-coach role at Hastings United, but he was subsequently offered the role of manager of the U18 and U23 teams at Gillingham, where he had already been coaching at the girls' academy.

References

External links

1988 births
Living people
English footballers
Association football midfielders
Gillingham F.C. players
Brentford F.C. players
Ebbsfleet United F.C. players
Maidstone United F.C. players
Dover Athletic F.C. players
Eastbourne Borough F.C. players
Tonbridge Angels F.C. players
Grays Athletic F.C. players
Hastings United F.C. players
English Football League players
National League (English football) players
Isthmian League players
Sportspeople from Gravesend, Kent
Gillingham F.C. non-playing staff